New Zealand political leader Don Brash assembled a "shadow cabinet" within the National Party caucus after his election to the position of Leader of the Opposition in 2003. He composed this of individuals who acted for the party as spokespeople in assigned roles while he was Leader of the Opposition (2003–2006).

As the National Party formed the largest party not in government at the time, the frontbench team was as a result the Official Opposition within the New Zealand House of Representatives.

Frontbench team
The list below contains a list of Brash's spokespeople and their respective roles as announced 26 October 2005. The first twenty-seven members are given rankings.

References

New Zealand National Party
Brash, Don
2003 establishments in New Zealand
2006 disestablishments in New Zealand